The law of New York consists of several levels, including constitutional, statutory, regulatory and case law, and also includes local laws, ordinances, and regulations. The Consolidated Laws form the general statutory law.

The Constitution of New York is the foremost source of state law. The legislation of the Legislature is published in the official Laws of New York and codified in the Consolidated Laws of New York. State agency rules and regulations are promulgated in the New York State Register and compiled in the New York Codes, Rules and Regulations. Because New York is a common law state, every opinion, memorandum, and motion sent by the New York Court of Appeals (New York's highest court) and the Appellate Division of the New York Supreme Court (an intermediate appeals court) is published. Each local government may also adopt local laws, and counties, cities, and towns may promulgate ordinances to the extent authorized by state law, e.g. the New York City Administrative Code.

Constitution
All state and municipal powers are derived from the Constitution of New York, which is, in turn, subordinate to the Constitution of the United States and federal laws and treaties, which are the supreme law of the land. Parallel to the U.S. constitution, legislative power is vested in a bicameral legislature composed of the New York Assembly and New York State Senate. Judicial power is divided between state and local courts. At the state level, New York's lowest court of general jurisdiction is the New York Supreme Court, which is overseen by 4 appellate divisions and, ultimately, the New York Court of Appeals. Additionally, municipalities are authorized to operate city, town, village, and district courts for low-level matters. New York's executive power is primarily vested in its governor, much as the U.S. Constitution vests executive power in the President. One key difference is that the New York Constitution also vests power directly in the state's Attorney General and Comptroller, since these positions are directly elected, unlike the U.S. Constitution where the analogous roles are appointed by the President.

Statutory law
Pursuant to the state constitution, the New York State Legislature has enacted legislation, called chapter laws or slip laws when printed separately. The bills and concurrent resolutions proposing amendments to the state or federal constitutions of each legislative session are called session laws and published in the official Laws of New York.

The codification of the permanent laws of a general nature are contained in the Consolidated Laws of New York. New York uses a system called "continuous codification" whereby each session law clearly identifies the law and section of the Consolidated Laws affected by its passage. Unlike real codes, the Consolidated Laws are systematic but neither comprehensive nor preemptive, and reference to other laws and case law is often necessary. There also exist unconsolidated laws, such as the various court acts. Unconsolidated laws are uncodified, typically due to their local nature, but are otherwise legally binding.

There are also numerous sources used for statutory interpretation (e.g., legislative intent, legal hermeneutics), including governors' bill, veto, and recall jackets.

Administrative law

Pursuant to certain broadly worded statutes, state agencies and courts have promulgated an enormous body of rules and regulations (delegated legislation). Regulations are promulgated with and published in the New York State Register and compiled in the New York Codes, Rules and Regulations (NYCRR). There are also numerous decisions, opinions, and rulings of state agencies. Altogether these are sometimes called administrative law.

Case law

Decisions of the New York Court of Appeals are binding authority on all other courts, and persuasive authority for itself in later cases. Decisions of the New York Supreme Court, Appellate Division department panels are binding on the lower courts, and are persuasive authority for the Court of Appeals and other Appellate Division departments. In the absence of a relevant Appellate Division decision from a trial court's own department, the trial court is bound by the applicable decisions of other departments. Decisions by the Supreme Court, Appellate Term must be followed by courts whose appeals lie to it. Published trial court decisions are persuasive authority for all other courts in the state.

The New York State Courts Electronic Filing System (NYSCEF) is the electronic court filing (e-filing) system. The New York State Reporter of the New York State Law Reporting Bureau is the official reporter of decisions and is required to publish every opinion, memorandum, and motion sent to it by the Court of Appeals and the Appellate Division of the Supreme Court in the New York Reports and Appellate Division Reports, respectively. The trial court and Supreme Court appellate term opinions are published selectively in the Miscellaneous Reports. The most recent decisions are found in the New York Reports 3d (cited as N.Y.3d), the Appellate Division Reports 3d (cited as A.D.3d) and the Miscellaneous Reports 3d (cited as Misc. 3d). Select opinions of the lower courts in the first and second departments are also published in the New York Law Journal.

Local law

New York is divided into counties, cities, towns, and villages, which are all municipal corporations with their own government. New York City contains no county, town or village governments other than the government of New York City. The Constitution of New York enumerates the powers of local governments, such as the power to elect a legislative body and adopt local laws. Counties, cities, and towns may also promulgate ordinances in addition to laws. A local law has a status equivalent with a law enacted by the Legislature (subject to certain exceptions and restrictions), and is superior to the older forms of municipal legislation such as ordinances, resolutions, rules and regulations.

Each local government (such as counties) must designate a newspaper of notice to publish or describe its laws. The Secretary of State is responsible for publishing local laws online and as a supplement to the Laws of New York. Local laws are not effective until they have been filed with the Secretary of State in the form designated.

With respect to New York City, the codified local laws are contained in the New York City Administrative Code consisting of 29 titles, the regulations promulgated by city agencies are contained in the Rules of the City of New York consisting of 71 titles, and The City Record is the official journal (newspaper of notice) published each weekday (except legal holidays) containing legal notices produced by city agencies.

Treatises
There are also several sources of persuasive authority, which are not binding authority but are useful to lawyers and judges insofar as they help to clarify the current state of the law.

See also

Topic
 Alcohol laws of New York
 Capital punishment in New York
 Certificate of disposition
 New York divorce law
 New York energy law
 Felony murder rule (New York)
 Gun laws in New York
 Necessity defense (New York)
 Molineux hearing
 Motion to dismiss in the interest of justice
 LGBT rights in New York
 Rent control in New York

Legislation
 Rockefeller Drug Laws
 New York City Human Rights Law
 Libby Zion Law
 Soda Ban

Other
 Politics of New York
 Law enforcement in New York
 Crime in New York
 Law of the United States

Citations

General and cited references

External links
 Laws, court acts, and legislative chamber rules from the New York State Senate
 Laws of New York from the Legislative Bill Drafting Commission
 Consolidated Laws from FindLaw
 Consolidated Laws from Justia
 Consolidated Laws from Socratek
 New York Codes, Rules and Regulations from West
 New York State Register from the New York State Department of State
 New York State Register from West
 New York Slip Opinion Service from the New York State Law Reporting Bureau
 Court slip opinions from the New York State Office of Court Administration
 New York Official Reports Service from West
 New York State Courts Electronic Filing System from the New York State Office of Court Administration
 New York City Administrative Code and Rules of the City of New York from New York Legal Publishing Corporation
 New York City Administrative Code from FindLaw
 Rules of the City of New York from the New York City Department of Information Technology and Telecommunications
 Local Laws Database from the New York State Department of State
 Local law codes from Public.Resource.Org
 CityAdmin, a collection of NYC administrative decisions from the Center for New York City Law
 Case law: 
 Governors' bill, veto and recall jackets in the New York State Library

 
New York